Aya Abdul Nasser El Boukhary (born 4 October 2002) is a Lebanese footballer who plays as a midfielder for Lebanese club SAS.

Club career
Having previously played for United Tripoli, El Boukhary joined Salam Zgharta in 2018, where she spent two seasons. She played at under-17, under-19 and senior level. On 21 July 2020, El Boukhary joined league runners-up Safa ahead of the 2020–21 season. She moved to defending champions SAS in September 2022.

Honours 
Safa
 WAFF Women's Clubs Championship: 2022
 Lebanese Women's Football League: 2020–21

Lebanon
 WAFF Women's Championship third place: 2019

See also
 List of Lebanon women's international footballers

References

External links

 
 
 

2002 births
Living people
Sportspeople from Tripoli, Lebanon
Lebanese women's footballers
Women's association football midfielders
Salam Zgharta FC (women) players
Safa WFC players
Stars Association for Sports players
Lebanese Women's Football League players
Lebanon women's youth international footballers
Lebanon women's international footballers